The following lists events that happened during 1924 in New Zealand.

Incumbents

Regal and viceregal
 Head of State – George V
 Governor-General – John Jellicoe, Viscount Jellicoe until 26 November, then  Sir Charles Fergusson from 13 December

Government
The 21st New Zealand Parliament continues. The Reform Party governs as a minority with the support of independents.

 Speaker of the House – Charles Statham
 Prime Minister – William Massey
 Minister of Finance – William Massey
 Minister of External Affairs – Francis Bell

Parliamentary opposition
 Leader of the Opposition – Thomas Wilford (Liberal Party)

Judiciary
 Chief Justice – Sir Robert Stout

Main centre leaders
 Mayor of Auckland – James Gunson
 Mayor of Wellington – Robert Wright
 Mayor of Christchurch – James Flesher
 Mayor of Dunedin – Harold Tapley

Events 
 29 September – The first trolleybus route in Wellington is inaugurated
 17 November – HMS Torch hits a rock in the Chatham Islands, and is subsequently beached and abandoned 
 Undated – Actinidia deliciosa 'Hayward', later to become the main commercial cultivar of kiwifruit, is first grown

Arts and literature

See 1924 in art, 1924 in literature :Category:1924 books

Music

See: 1924 in music

Broadcasting
See:  Public broadcasting in New Zealand

Film
 Venus of the South Seas
See:  1924 in film, List of New Zealand feature films, Cinema of New Zealand, :Category:1924 films

Sport

Chess
 The 33rd National Chess Championship is held in Wellington, and is won by S. Crakanthorp of Sydney.

Football
 The 2nd Chatham Cup is won by Harbour Board (Auckland)
 A Chinese Universities football team tours New Zealand, including four matches against the national team:
 16 August, at Auckland: New Zealand win 2–1
 23 August, at Wellington: draw 2–2
 6 September,	at Dunedin: New Zealand win 5–3
 13 September, at Christchurch: New Zealand win 4–2
 Provincial league champions:
 Auckland – Harbour Board
 Canterbury – Sunnyside
 Hawke's Bay – Whakatu
 Nelson – Athletic
 Otago – Seacliff
 South Canterbury – Albion Rovers
 Southland – Corinthians
 Taranaki – Kaponga
 Wanganui – YMCA
 Wellington – YMCA

Golf
 The 11th New Zealand Open championship is won by Ernie Moss, with an aggregate of 301.
 The 28th National Amateur Championships are held in Auckland (men) and Hamilton (women)
 Men – L. Quin (Eltham)
 Women – Mrs Peake (Cambridge)

Horse racing

Harness racing
 New Zealand Trotting Cup – Sheik
 Auckland Trotting Cup – Locanda Mac

Thoroughbred racing
 New Zealand Cup – Sunart
 Auckland Cup – Te Kara
 Wellington Cup – Loughrea
 New Zealand Derby – Count Cavour
 ARC Great Northern Derby – Ballymena

Lawn bowls
The national outdoor lawn bowls championships are held in Christchurch.
 Men's singles champion – W. Carswell (Taieri Bowling Club)
 Men's pair champions – James Angus, J. A. Redpath (skip) (Canterbury Bowling Club)
 Men's fours champions – W. Ure, H. S. Hill, C. G. Maher, Bill Bremner (skip) (West End Bowling Club, Auckland)

Olympic games

{| class="wikitable"
|-
!  !!  !!  !! Total
|- style="text-align:center;"
| 0 || 0 || 1 || 1
|}
 New Zealand sends a team of four competitors across three sports
 Arthur Porritt wins the bronze medal in the men's 100 metres

Rugby league
 New Zealand host the touring Great Britain team, winning the test series 2–1
 1st test, at Dunedin, lose 18–31
 2nd test, at Wellington, win 13–11
 3rd test, at Auckland, win 16–8

Rugby union
 The All Blacks tour the United Kingdom, Ireland, France and Canada between September 1924 and February 1925, winning all 32 games, and earning the nickname The Invincibles
 The Ranfurly Shield is held and defended by Hawkes Bay all season

Wrestling
 Ike Robin is recognised as New Zealand's first wrestling champion

Births

January
 5 January – Ivan Wyatt, cricketer (d. 2009)
 11 January – Rex Cunningham, rugby league player (d. 2015)
 13 January – Brian Barratt-Boyes, heart surgeon  (d. 2006)
 15 January
 Barbara Angus, diplomat, historian (d. 2005)
 George Lowe, mountaineer and explorer (d. 2013)
 21 January
 Bill Andersen, trade unionist (d. 2005)
 Ronald Sinclair, actor, film editor (d. 1992)
 22 January – Ortvin Sarapu, chess player (d. 1999)
 27 January
 Lyn Philp, boxer  (d. 1981)
 Hector Wilson, rugby union player (d. 2004)
 28 January – Wharetutu Stirling, Ngāi Tahu leader, conservationist (d. 1993)

February
 14 February
 Bos Murphy, boxer (d. 2000)
 Reg Singer, association footballer (d. 2001)
 24 February – Jack Forrest, rugby league player (d. 2016)
 27 February – John Shanahan, swimmer  (d. 1987)
 29 February – David Beattie, jurist, sports administrator, 14th Governor-General of New Zealand (d. 2001)

March
 5 March – Nau Cherrington, rugby union player (d. 1979)
 6 March – Percy Murphy, politician, first Māori mayor (d. 2009)
 7 March
 J.G.A. Pocock, historian
 Brownie Puriri, public servant (d. 1979)
 9 March – Warren Sinclair, radiation science and medicine expert (d. 2014)
 10 March – Peter Stichbury, potter (d. 2015)
 22 March – Grace Gooder, cricketer (d. 1983)
 24 March – Norm Holland, jockey (d. 2014)
 26 March
 Jack McNab, rugby union player, coach and administrator (d. 2009)
 Josie Yelas, netball player (d. 1996)
 29 March – Haydn Sherley, broadcaster (d. 2007)
 31 March – Joan de Hamel, children's writer (d. 2011)

April
 2 April – Lauris Edmond, poet and writer  (d. 2000)
 3 April – Errol Brathwaite, writer (d. 2005)
 18 April – Tiny White, equestrian (d. 2020)
 30 April
 Richard Giese, flautist (d. 2010)
 Mervyn Probine, physicist, public servant (d. 2010)

May
 1 May – Ted Johnson, rower (d. 1985)
 5 May – Frank Creagh, boxer (d. 1998)
 12 May – Malcolm Templeton, diplomat (d. 2017)
 22 May – Stella Casey, social campaigner (d. 2000)

June
 2 June – Pat Evison, actor (d. 2010)
 3 June – Ken Armstrong, association footballer (d. 1984)
 7 June – Bob Tizard, politician (d. 2016)
 8 June – Ian Colquhoun, cricketer  (d. 2005)
 9 June – John Scott, architect  (d. 1992)
 14 June
 David Ballantyne, journalist, writer  (d. 1986)
 Miriam Dell, women's advocate (d. 2022)

July
 7 July – D. P. O'Connell, barrister, legal academic (d. 1979)
 15 July
 Bub Bridger, poet and short story writer (d. 2009)
 Brian Sutton-Smith, writer and play theorist (d. 2015)
 23 July – Betty Bourke, politician, health administrator (d. 2015)
 25 July
 Jim Beard, architect  (d. 2017)
 Peter Mann, Anglican bishop (d. 1999)
 26 July – Ces Renwick, cricketer (d. 2014)
 28 July
 Eric Fisher, cricketer (d. 1996)
 William Fraser, politician  (d. 2001)

August
 1 August – Peter Smith, rugby union player (d. 1954)
 2 August – Ainsley Iggo, neurophysiologist (d. 2012)
 7 August – Alan Wilkinson, association footballer (d. 2015)
 13 August – John Rymer, Anglican cleric (d. 2003)
 22 August – Pat O'Connor, professional wrestler (d. 1990)
 23 August
 Bahri Kavaja, association footballer (d. 1987)
 Doug Mudgway, amateur wrestler (d. 1988)
 28 August
 Tony MacGibbon, cricketer (d. 2010)
 Janet Frame, writer (d. 2004)
 31 August – Don Beaven, medical researcher (d. 2009)

September
 3 September – John Ingram, mechanical engineer, businessman  (d. 2015)
 4 September – Lory Blanchard, rugby league player and coach (d. 2013)
 5 September – Nick Carter, cyclist (d. 2003)
 6 September – Hugh Poole, sailor (d. 2012)
 7 September – Wanda Cowley, children's writer (d. 2017)
 8 September – Frank Holmes, economist (d. 2011)
 15 September – Rex Challies, cricketer  (d. 2003)
 17 September – Les Watt, cricketer (d. 1996)
 23 September – Peggy Hay, designer (d. 2016)
 24 September – Sammy Guillen, cricketer (d. 2013)
 27 September – Louis Johnson, poet (d. 1988)
 30 September – Trevor Hatherton, geophysicist  (d. 1992)

October
 5 October – Victor Brooker, cricketer
 11 October – Arthur Hughes, rugby union player, businessman, horse racing administrator (d. 2005)
 19 October – Keith Gudsell, rugby union player (d. 2007)
 30 October – Roy McLennan, politician (d. 2013)

November
 5 November – Geoff Smale, sailor (d. 2011)
 23 November
 Doug Coombes, mineralogist and petrologist (d. 2016)
 Doug Dillon, jurist (d. 1999)
 28 November – Colin McLachlan, politician (d. 1985)

December
 2 December
 Gerald O'Brien, politician (d. 2017)
 Brian Poananga, sportsman, military leader, diplomat (d. 1995)
 5 December – Gavin Downie, politician (d. 1998)
 7 December – Jimmy Haig, rugby union and rugby league player (d. 1996)
 12 December
 Neill Austin, politician  (d. 2008)
 Brown Turei, Anglican archbishop (d. 2017)
 23 December – Len Castle, potter (d. 2011)
 26 December – Leonard Kent, cricketer (d. 2014)
 28 December – Loo-Chi Hu, marine equipment designer, t'ai chi teacher (d. 2013)
 29 December
 Eve Poole, 41st Mayor of Invercargill (d. 1992)
 Bob Vance, cricket player and administrator (d. 1994)
 Ivan Walsh, association footballer, cricketer (d. 2005)
 30 December – Joe Phillips, rugby league player (d. 1969)

Deaths

January–March
 5 January – Mary Player, midwife, feminist, social reformer (born 1857)
 6 January – Henry Hill, cricketer (born 1845)
 19 January – Frances Parker, suffragette (born 1875)
 24 January – Acton Adams, politician (born 1843)
 27 January – William Gardiner, cricketer (born 1864)
 2 February
 Daniel Claffey, cricketer (born 1869)
 John Duncan, politician (born 1848)
 11 February – Arthur Lomas, cricketer (born 1895)
 17 February – James Tibbs, schoolteacher (born 1855)
 22 February – Mary Dawson, farmer, environmentalist (born 1833)
 24 February – Joseph Borton, cricketer (born 1832)
 1 March – Elizabeth Parsons, singer (born 1846)
 4 March – Gilbert Carson, politician (born 1842)
 6 March – Grace Joel, artist (born 1865)
 10 March – George Bourne, photographer (born 1875)
 17 March – Martin Chapman, cricketer, barrister, politician (born 1846)

April–June
 3 April – Alfred Newman, politician (born 1849)
 19 April – Charles Louisson, politician (born 1842)
 7 May – Alfred Luttrell, architect and building contractor (born 1865)
 9 May – James Mason, doctor, bacteriologist, public health administrator (born 1864)
 19 May – Joseph Pabst, cricketer (born 1870)

July–September
 17 July – William Davidson, pioneer of refrigerated shipping (born 1846)
 19 July – Sir Walter Buchanan. politician (born 1838)
 25 July – Lawrence Birks, electrical engineer (born 1874)
 10 August – Edward Wakefield, politician (born 1845)
 19 August – Alfred Baldey, politician (born 1836)
 17 September – Richard Vincent, cricketer (born 1846)
 19 September – Sir John Salmond, legal academic, public servant, jurist (born 1862)
 27 September – Thomson Leys, journalist, newspaper editor and proprietor, philanthropist (born 1850)

October–December
 18 October – Walter Mason, cricketer (born 1847)
 23 October – Eparaima Te Mutu Kapa, politician (born 1842)
 13 November – Charles Boxshall, cricketer (born 1862)
 27 November – Joseph Grimmond, politician (born 1843)
 15 December – Paratene Ngata, Ngāti Porou leader, politician (born 1849)
 19 December – William Maslin, politician (born 1850)

See also
History of New Zealand
List of years in New Zealand
Military history of New Zealand
Timeline of New Zealand history
Timeline of New Zealand's links with Antarctica
Timeline of the New Zealand environment

References

External links

 
Years of the 20th century in New Zealand